The 2016–17 Alaska Aces season was the 31st season of the franchise in the Philippine Basketball Association (PBA).

Key dates

2016
October 30: The 2016 PBA draft took place at Midtown Atrium, Robinson Place Manila.

Draft picks

Special draft

Regular draft
Alaska passed in the regular draft. They originally owned one second round and two third round picks.

Roster

  also serves as Alaska's board governor.

Philippine Cup

Eliminations

Standings

Game log

|- style="background:#fcc;"
| 1
| November 25
| NLEX
| L 97–99 (OT) 
| Carl Bryan Cruz (20)
| Carl Bryan Cruz (14)
| RJ Jazul (6)
| Smart Araneta Coliseum
| 0–1

|- style="background:#fcc;"
| 2
| December 3
| San Miguel
| L 88–93
| JVee Casio (20)
| Carl Bryan Cruz (7)
| Chris Banchero (9)
| Smart Araneta Coliseum
| 0–2
|- style="background:#cfc;"
| 3
| December 7
| GlobalPort
| W 95–84
| Calvin Abueva (22)
| Calvin Abueva (11)
| Chris Banchero (8)
| Mall of Asia Arena
| 1–2
|- style="background:#cfc;"
| 4
| December 14
| Meralco
| W 81–79
| Vic Manuel (22)
| Vic Manuel (10)
| Abueva, Banchero (5)
| Smart Araneta Coliseum
| 2–2
|- style="background:#cfc;"
| 5
| December 18
| Barangay Ginebra
| W 101–86
| RJ Jazul (16)
| Jake Pascual (8)
| Banchero, Galliguez (4)
| Smart Araneta Coliseum
| 3–2
|- style="background:#fcc;"
| 6
| December 23
| TNT
| L 100–109
| Calvin Abueva (18)
| Calvin Abueva (12)
| Calvin Abueva (4)
| PhilSports Arena
| 3–3

|- style="background:#cfc;"
| 7
| January 11
| Star
| W 97–90 (OT)
| Vic Manuel (25)
| Calvin Abueva (9)
| Chris Banchero (6)
| Smart Araneta Coliseum
| 4–3
|- style="background:#fcc;"
| 8
| January 15
| Blackwater
| L 100–103
| Abueva, Casio (23)
| Calvin Abueva (14)
| Casio, Jazul (5)
| Smart Araneta Coliseum
| 4–4
|- style="background:#cfc;"
| 9
| January 22
| Mahindra
| W 107–91
| Vic Manuel (20)
| Calvin Abueva (10)
| JVee Casio (6)
| PhilSports Arena
| 5–4
|- style="background:#cfc;"
| 10
| January 27
| Phoenix
| W 106–85
| Vic Manuel (21)
| Vic Manuel (7)
| Casio, Jazul (6)
| Cuneta Astrodome
| 6–4

|- style="background:#cfc;"
| 11
| February 1
| Rain or Shine
| W 94–89
| JVee Casio (25)
| Vic Manuel (12) 
| five players (2)
| Cuneta Astrodome
| 7–4

Playoffs

Bracket

Game log

|- style="background:#fcc;"
| 1
| February 5
| Barangay Ginebra
| L 81–85
| Calvin Abueva (20)
| Calvin Abueva (10)
| JVee Casio (5)
| Ynares Center
| 0–1
|- style="background:#fcc;"
| 2
| February 7
| Barangay Ginebra
| L 97–108
| Calvin Abueva (29)
| Calvin Abueva (13)
| JVee Casio (4)
| Smart Araneta Coliseum
| 0–2

Commissioner's Cup

Eliminations

Standings

Game log

|- style="background:#cfc;"
| 1
| March 18
| GlobalPort
| W 107–79
| Cory Jefferson (28)
| Cory Jefferson (14)
| Simon Enciso (6)
| Cuneta Astrodome
| 1–0
|- style="background:#cfc;"
| 2
| March 22
| Blackwater
| W 109–95
| Cory Jefferson (28)
| Cory Jefferson (15)
| Simon Enciso (7)
| Smart Araneta Coliseum
| 2–0
|- style="background:#cfc;"
| 3
| March 29
| Mahindra
| W 98–92
| Cory Jefferson (30)
| Cory Jefferson (11) 
| Simon Enciso (5)
| Mall of Asia Arena
| 3–0

|- style="background:#cfc;"
| 4
| April 2
| Rain or Shine
| W 105–102
| Cory Jefferson (41)
| Cory Jefferson (13)
| JVee Casio (8)
| Smart Araneta Coliseum
| 4–0
|- style="background:#fcc;"
| 5
| April 8
| Meralco
| L 91–99
| Cory Jefferson (32)
| Cory Jefferson (13)
| Simon Enciso (3)
| Mall of Asia Arena
| 4–1
|- style="background:#fcc;"
| 6
| April 21
| Phoenix
| L 86–94
| Cory Jefferson (31)
| Cory Jefferson (13)
| Simon Enciso (6)
| Smart Araneta Coliseum
| 4–2
|- align="center"
|colspan="9" bgcolor="#bbcaff"|All-Star Break

|- style="background:#fcc;"
| 7
| May 7
| Barangay Ginebra
| L 102–103
| Cory Jefferson (25)
| Cory Jefferson (18)
| Simon Enciso (10)
| Smart Araneta Coliseum
| 4–3
|- style="background:#fcc;"
| 8
| May 20
| TNT
| L 110–119
| Cory Jefferson (29)
| Abueva, Jefferson (7)
| Chris Banchero (5)
| Ibalong Centrum for Recreation
| 4–4
|- style="background:#fcc;"
| 9
| May 24
| NLEX
| L 92–100
| Cory Jefferson (36)
| Cory Jefferson (20)
| Banchero, Enciso (3)
| Smart Araneta Coliseum
| 4–5
|- style="background:#fcc;"
| 10
| May 27
| San Miguel
| L 97–109
| Cory Jefferson (23)
| Cory Jefferson (13)
| Chris Banchero (8)
| Ynares Center
| 4–6
|- style="background:#fcc;"
| 11
| May 31
| Star
| L 98–102 (OT)
| Calvin Abueva (22)
| Cory Jefferson (13)
| Chris Banchero (7)
| Cuneta Astrodome
| 4–7

Playoffs

Bracket

Game log

|- style="background:#fcc;"
| 1
| June 4
| GlobalPort
| L 106–107
| Cory Jefferson (32)
| Cory Jefferson (16)
| Chris Exciminiano (4)
| Mall of Asia Arena
| 0–1

Governors' Cup

Eliminations

Standings

Game log

|- style="background:#fcc;"
| 1
| July 19
| NLEX
| L 104–112
| LaDontae Henton (27)
| Calvin Abueva (14)
| Chris Banchero (8)
| Smart Araneta Coliseum
| 0–1
|- style="background:#fcc;"
| 2
| July 22
| Phoenix
| L 93–95
| LaDontae Henton (30)
| LaDontae Henton (10)
| Abueva, Enciso (5)
| Mall of Asia Arena
| 0–2
|- style="background:#fcc;"
| 3
| July 28
| Star
| L 92–101
| LaDontae Henton (34)
| Chris Banchero (7)
| Chris Banchero (6)
| Ynares Center
| 0–3

|- style="background:#fcc;"
| 4
| August 4
| TNT
| L 106–107
| LaDontae Henton (42)
| LaDontae Henton (22)
| four players (2)
| Smart Araneta Coliseum
| 0–4
|- style="background:#fcc;"
| 5
| August 23
| Blackwater
| L 106–111 (2OT)
| LaDontae Henton (31)
| LaDontae Henton (10)
| Casio, Mendoza (6)
| Smart Araneta Coliseum
| 0–5
|- style="background:#fcc;"
| 6
| August 26
| Barangay Ginebra
| L 80–94
| Calvin Abueva (22)
| Calvin Abueva (13)
| JVee Casio (4)
| Hoops Dome
| 0–6

|- style="background:#cfc;"
| 7
| September 2
| San Miguel
| W 90–79
| LaDontae Henton (36)
| LaDontae Henton (15)
| JVee Casio (7)
| Angeles University Foundation Sports Arena
| 1–6
|- style="background:#cfc;"
| 8
| September 8
| GlobalPort
| W 101–88
| LaDontae Henton (36)
| LaDontae Henton (21)
| Casio, Enciso (5)
| Mall of Asia Arena
| 2–6
|- style="background:#cfc;"
| 9
| September 10
| Kia
| W 102–94
| Calvin Abueva (26)
| Calvin Abueva (15)
| Casio, Henton (7)
| Smart Araneta Coliseum
| 3–6
|- style="background:#fcc;"
| 10
| September 15
| Meralco
| L 78–106
| LaDontae Henton (23)
| Calvin Abueva (11)
| five players (2)
| Smart Araneta Coliseum
| 3–7
|- style="background:#fcc;" 
| 11
| September 20
| Rain or Shine
| L 82–112
| LaDontae Henton (20)
| LaDontae Henton (7)
| Baclao, Enciso (4) 
| Ynares Center 
| 3–8

Transactions

Trades

Recruited imports

Awards

References

Alaska Aces (PBA) seasons
Alaska Aces season